Madame Tussauds Sydney is a wax museum located in Darling Harbour in Sydney, Australia and is situated on the Aquarium Wharf. Madame Tussauds is part of Merlin Entertainments which owns and operates attractions globally.

History
Madame Tussauds Sydney opened in April 2012 and was the thirteenth Madame Tussauds to open in the world. The attraction is the only one of its kind in Australia.

Exhibits
Madame Tussauds Sydney has a range of interactive experiences inside the attraction. 
Experiences include: 

In 2015, Madame Tussauds Sydney launched simultaneously three different Madonna wax figures, making it the first time they revealed that amount of one female performer in their history.

References

External links
        
 
 Sydney.com — Madame Tussauds Sydney      
 Official Opening Media Release  
 Weekend Notes

Madame Tussauds
Wax museums
Museums in Sydney
Tourist attractions in Sydney
Darling Harbour